Justice Horsey may refer to:

Charles Lee Horsey, associate justice of the Supreme Court of Nevada
Henry R. Horsey, associate justice of the Delaware Supreme Court